Hawkesdown Hill is an Iron Age Hill fort close to Axmouth in Devon situated on a prominent hillside above the Axe Estuary.

References

Hill forts in Devon
Hills of Devon